The Taubenkopf is a hill, in the German state of Rhineland-Palatinate. It is part of the mountain chain of the Haardt in the Palatine Forest and lies in the municipal territory of Diedesfeld in the borough of Neustadt an der Weinstraße.

Geography 

The Taubenkopf, like the hills of Breitenberg (545.2 m), Wetterkreuzberg (400.7 m), Hüttenberg (591.2 m) and the Kanzel (531.7 m), is one of the outlying peaks on the Kalmit massif (672.6 m). Before storm damage and the subsequent removal of wood, the summit dome was in the shape of a dove's head (Taubenkopf). Following the deforestation there is a 270 degree outlook from west (into the Palatine Forest) through north (Hohe Loog) to east (Klausental, Sommerberg and the Rhine Plain). Few hilltops of this height so close to the Rhine Plain have been cleared of trees.

Tourism 
The Taubenkopf is an important hub for several walking routes, which converge 20 metres in height below the summit. These are the blue and white waymarked path from the Totenkopf via the Hahnenschritt, the white and green main trail from Maikammer and the unmarked Klausental to Diedesfeld footpath (the Hinkelstein Path).

References

External links 

Mountains and hills of the Palatinate Forest
Neustadt an der Weinstraße